Ponette is a 1996 French film directed by Jacques Doillon. The film centers on four-year-old Ponette (Victoire Thivisol), who is coming to terms with the death of her mother in a car crash.

The film received acclaim for Thivisol's performance, who was only four at the time of filming.

Plot

Before the film begins, Ponette's mother dies in a car crash, which Ponette herself survives with only a broken arm (she consequently must wear an arm cast).

Following her mother's death, Ponette's father (Xavier Beauvois) leaves the young girl with her Aunt Claire (Claire Nebout), and her cousins Matiaz (Matiaz Bureau Caton) and Delphine (Delphine Schiltz). Ponette and her cousins are later sent to a boarding school. There the loss of her mother becomes even more harsh and painful when she is mocked on the playground for being motherless. 

Not yet having come to terms with her mother's death, Ponette searches for her. Ponette becomes increasingly withdrawn, and spends most of her time waiting for her mother to come back.

When waiting alone fails, Ponette enlists the help of her school friend Ada (Léopoldine Serre) to help her become a "child of God" to hopefully convince God to return her mother, in vain. 

In the end, Ponette visits a cemetery and cries for her mother, who suddenly appears to comfort her and ask her to live her life and not be sad all the time. Her mother (played by Marie Trintignant) says she cannot keep coming back, so Ponette must move on and go be happy with her father.

Then it appears that her mother gives her a sweater that she did not bring to the cemetery, and her father comments when he sees her that "I haven't seen that sweater in a while".

Cast 
 Victoire Thivisol as Ponette
 Delphine Schiltz as Delphine
 Matiaz Bureau Caton as Matiaz
 Léopoldine Serre as Ada
 Marie Trintignant as Mother
 Xavier Beauvois as Father
 Claire Nebout as Aunt Claire

Critical response
On the review aggregator website Rotten Tomatoes, the film has an approval rating of 91%, based on 22 reviews, with an average rating of 8.2/10.

Accolades

References

External links

French drama films
1996 films
Films directed by Jacques Doillon
Films produced by Alain Sarde
Films scored by Philippe Sarde